Granite Island is a small, uninhabited granite island in Corner Inlet near the northern coast of Wilsons Promontory, in Victoria, Australia.

The island is part of Wilsons Promontory National Park, the Corner Inlet Important Bird Area, and the Corner Inlet Ramsar site. The surrounding waters are within Corner Inlet Marine National Park and Corner Inlet Marine and Coastal Park.

References

Islands of Victoria (Australia)
Wilsons Promontory
Uninhabited islands of Australia